Sarojini Yogeswaran (née Ponnambalam) was a Sri Lankan politician. Yogeswaran was a member of the Tamil United Liberation Front.  In 1997, she was elected mayor of Jaffna, the first elected mayor in 14 years and also the first woman mayor of the city.

Mrs. Yogeswaran was shot five times with a pistol near her Jaffna home on 17 May 1998.  She died on the way to hospital. A LTTE front organization called the Sankiliyan Force claimed responsibility.

Further reading

References

External links 
 Amnesty International statement
 TamilNet report

1998 deaths
Assassinated mayors
Assassinated Sri Lankan politicians
Deaths by firearm in Sri Lanka
Mayors of Jaffna
People killed during the Sri Lankan Civil War
Sri Lankan Hindus
Sri Lankan Tamil politicians
Sri Lankan Tamil women
Sri Lankan terrorism victims
Tamil United Liberation Front politicians
Terrorism deaths in Sri Lanka
Terrorist incidents in Sri Lanka in 1998
Women mayors of places in Sri Lanka
Year of birth missing